The Fiat 127 is a supermini car produced by Italian car manufacturer FIAT from 1971 to 1983. It was introduced in 1971 as the replacement for the Fiat 850. Production of the 127 in Italy ended in 1983 following the introduction of its replacement, the Fiat Uno, although the nameplate continued to be used on cars imported from Brazil.

Series 1

Developed towards the end of the 1960s, the Fiat 127 was launched as a two-door saloon in April 1971. A three-door hatchback, using an identical body profile but with a full-depth rear door and folding rear seat, was launched in March of the following year; this would prove to be the most popular version of the 127. This was Fiat's first supermini-sized hatchback. The 127 featured a state-of-the-art transverse-engine/front-wheel-drive layout, with the transmission mounted on the end of the engine. Both design ideas had been fully vetted by Fiat, using its Autobianchi subsidiary 1964 Primula, 1969 A112 and A111 — precisely because the models were not targeted for large production. The larger Fiat 128, launched in 1969, was the first Fiat-badged car to use the same transverse powertrain layout. The 127, like the A112, used a shrunken version of the 128 platform, as well as the rugged Fiat OHV 100 series 903 cc engine that had powered the Autobianchi and, with various cylinder capacities, earlier generations of Fiat cars. The 127 also featured a unique transverse leaf spring suspension at the rear. Safety was another area of innovation: the 127 included an articulated steering column and crumple zones for progressive deformation under impact.

The car was one of the first of the modern superminis, and won praise for its use of space (80 percent of the floor space was available for passengers and luggage) as well as its road-holding. It was launched a year before the comparable Renault 5, and before the end of the 1970s most mass market European manufacturers were producing similar cars, including the Ford Fiesta and Volkswagen Polo, while General Motors added a three-door hatchback to the Opel Kadett range, which was reworked for British production and sold as the Vauxhall Chevette. The 127 was also one of the more popular imported cars on the UK market, peaking at more than 20,000 sales in 1978.

It was also the first car fitted with an all-polypropylene bumper on steel support. The 127 was an instant success, winning the European Car of the Year award for 1972, and quickly became one of the best-selling cars in Europe for several years. It was the third Fiat in six years to receive this accolade.

In June 1974, slightly over three years after the model's introduction, Fiat reported that the one millionth 127 had been completed at the Mirafiori plant in Turin, after just over three years in production. The (in its time) hugely successful Fiat 600 had taken seven years to reach that same milestone.

The Series 1 car changed little during its lifetime. However, in May 1973 saloons became available in both standard and deluxe versions. In 1975 the 127 Special variant was released which featured a restyled front grille and detail changes to the interior. The deluxe version was differentiated by its reclining front seats and opening hinged rear side windows as standard equipment. During the next couple of years the Fiat 850, which had initially been marketed alongside the 127, was withdrawn from most markets. In early 1976, the 127's engine was lightly modified to help it meet new emissions standards. A new carburetor and adjusted valve timing lowered power by two horsepower but also increased fuel economy by about ten percent.

Series 2

The Series 2 version of the 127 debuted in May 1977.  Although the bodyshell remained fundamentally the same, the Series 2 hinted towards a more angular styling direction which would be seen in the Ritmo/Strada the following year.  It featured a restyled front and rear and larger rear side windows without the curved beltline of the original, which was replaced with a distinctive "Hofmeister kink"  on the C-pillar. The new rear quarter pressings were derived from those used on the Brazilian market Fiat 147, although without the rear quarter extraction vent used in South America.  The Series 2 also offered the option of the 1049 cc engine - uniquely for the 127 this was the five-bearing OHC "Brazil" engine from the 147 rather than the Fiat OHC unit from the 128. The tailgate was extended and now reached nearly to the rear bumper, addressing complaints about the high lip over which luggage had to be lifted for loading into the earlier 127 hatchbacks. The interior was revised with a new dashboard which was identical in layout to the original car but was plainer in appearance and lost the wood embellishment of the Series 1. The underside of the dashboard was tidied up with new cover panels to enclose the steering column, brake master cylinder (on right hand drive versions) and the pedal mechanisms.

A new Sport model was available from June 1978 which featured a high output  version of the standard 1049 cc engine. This was achieved by incorporating Abarth revisions to the head with larger valves and an Abarth exhaust system and the use of a twin choke Weber carburetor. Changes were also made to the gearbox final ratio to improve the performance. The Sport model has bespoke high back sporty cloth seats with either blue or orange piping and bespoke racing wing mirrors as well as a rev counter, sports wheels, sports leather steering wheel and sport three-piece stripe with 127 Sport decals. It was available in three colours, Black with orange stripes, Silver with black stripes and Orange with black stripes.

In March 1980, the 147 Panorama went on sale in several European markets with "127" badging, originally only with the 1050 engine. The Panorama used the 147's recently updated "Europa" front, with reverse-angled rectangular headlights and blocky combined markerlights/turn signals wrapping around the corners. There was also a "high-cube" panel van version, known as the Fiorino, which was based on the Series 2 bodyshell. This remained in production until the end of 1987, when a new Uno-based Fiorino debuted.

Brazilian-built versions
The 147 itself went on sale in Italy under the name of 127 Rustica in 1979. This was a version meant for light off-road work, and received a spartan appearance and equipment. The 127 Rustica benefitted from the 147's stronger body, 1050 cc engine, reinforced suspension ("tropical" type springs front and rear), and a skid plate. The front and rear lights were protected by mesh grilles mounted on model-specific tubular metal bumpers, while it had the Brazilian dashboard and specific, lightly padded seats with a tubular structure and covered in brown leatherette. The Rustica was only offered with semi-matte military beige paint, black rims without hubcaps and winter tires, with the only option being a metal luggage rack. Noisy and very particular, the Rustica was removed from price lists in 1981 without a proper replacement until the 1983 introduction of the Panda 4x4. The Rusticas were assembled in Lamborghini's Sant'Agata Bolognese plant.

At the 1981 Geneva Motor Show, a diesel-engined version of the 127 was introduced with hatchback or Panorama bodywork. The diesel Series 2 was only built in Brazil and is technically a rebadged 147; it uses that model's headlight treatment which it shared with the 127 Panorama. The 147 had a stronger structure to better handle Brazilian roads and was considered more suitable for the additional weight and vibrations of the diesel engine. The Panorama and Diesel versions retained this design even as the Italian-made 127 changed over to the Series 3. From 1983, the "127 Unificata" introduced the same design across the entire 127/147 lineups.

Series 3

Despite a completely new replacement being only a year away, the Series 3 was presented in November 1981 and launched in Italy in January 1982, soon thereafter reaching other European markets. It is distinguishable from the Series 2 by its grille. The third series received a completely new dashboard design and interior, following the design language first seen in the Ritmo. Body panels are all as before, except for a longer bonnet required to clear the larger headlights. The 1301 cc Fiat Fiasa engine replaced the earlier 1050 in the Series 3 Sport. New for the Series 3 was also the option of a five-speed manual transmission, a first for the 127 as it had not fit in earlier models. It was available in the 1050 Super (called "Comfort" in some markets) and was also installed in the 127 Sport. The new 127 Sport cost less than its more highly strung predecessor, and had more power from its larger engine. It remained on sale in Italy until December 1983, when the Uno Turbo replaced it.

In nations like Norway, Denmark and Finland this generation was particularly successful. For 1983, Swiss buyers received the Autobianchi A112's 965 cc engine rather than the 903 cc unit in the 127 Special, so that the importer would not have to make two similar engines pass local emissions standards. Fiat also bumped up the compression ratio and installed a somewhat larger carburetor in the 1.05-litre 127 Super, increasing power somewhat so as to maintain its power advantage over the lesser 127 Special.

The 127 was replaced as Fiat's high volume product in this sector by the Fiat Uno in January 1983, though Italian manufacture continued until the end of 1983 and it continued in production in South America until 1995. The 127 disappeared from the right-hand drive British market soon after the Uno went on sale there in June 1983.

127 Unificata
After Italian production ended, Fiat imported the South American 127 Unificata to Europe until 1987, albeit only for left-hand drive markets. It is called "Unificata" (unified) as all models now received the same design; until then, Brazilian-made cars had their own design, meaning that 127 Diesel and Panorama models had been of very different appearance than their Series 2 and Series 3 siblings. The Unificata range was condensed, leaving only the 1050 petrol engine and the diesel. The five-door version was also discontinued, although SEAT kept offering this bodystyle on their Fura until 1986.

Engines

International variants

SEAT 127

As happened with other Fiat models of that era, SEAT made a Spanish version of this car called the SEAT 127. Due to SEAT design policy, a 4-door variant of the car was also produced, as well as a later five-door version. The second series' change to the side profile was also applied to these four-door versions, with a flatter and more angular rear side window line. SEAT also produced a unique variant of the 127 OHV engine. This had 1010 cc instead of 903 cc and produced . The four-door SEAT 127 was exported to certain markets with Fiat badging.

When their licence from Fiat expired, SEAT redesigned some parts of the car and created the SEAT Fura Dos. Some design parts of this model were also used in the Ibiza mark 1. SEAT produced 1,238,166 units of the 127 between 1972 and 1984.

Polski Fiat 127p

Fiat 127 was also produced under Fiat license by Polish automobile manufacturers FSO (between 1973 and 1975) and FSM (between 1974 and 1975) under the name Polski Fiat 127p. These were assembled using both Italian and Polish parts. Originally the Polski Fiat 127p was to be produced in large numbers as a people's car, but when it became apparent that it would be about 30% more expensive than the 126p it was decided to concentrate on the latter while the larger 127p was only produced in very small numbers.

Fiat 147

In Brazil the car was known as the Fiat 147 (later Spazio), a three-door station wagon version called "Panorama".  There was also a conventional two-door three-box saloon available, "Fiat Oggi", a pick-up called "City" and a van called "Fiorino" was also produced there. The Brazilian-built versions utilized a 1050 cc engine and a 1300 cc engine called "Fiasa" and also utilized a 1.3 L Diesel engine (for export markets only). From 1981 this variant (called a 127) was exported to Europe, to be sold alongside the 127 sedans and hatchbacks. A total of 1,169,312 units were built from 9 July 1976 to the end of 1986 in Brazil and 232,807 units were also built in Argentina between 1982 and 1996, as the Fiat 147, Spazio, and Vivace. It was also assembled in the CCA in Colombia.

Although the car achieved reasonable selling figures, the model was titled as "low-level" and "not so reliable" by early buyers, because Fiat was just starting to sell cars in Brazil in the late 1970s and early 1980s. It was the first model produced by FIAT in Brazil, in 1976.

Yugo GV
A Yugoslavian-built version of the Fiat 127 was imported to the United States as the Yugo GV and Yugo GVL from 1985 through 1992. It was powered by a 55-hp 1.1 liter inline 4-cylinder engine with a four-speed manual transmission. It was the cheapest new car in the U.S. at that time at $3990 plus a $389 destination charge.

VAZ-1101
The Soviet manufacturer VAZ expanded its existing collaboration with Fiat in the early 1970s to develop a 127-derived supermini which would have slotted below the existing Fiat 124-based Zhiguli sedan.  The car, designated VAZ-1101 however never made production, but formed the basis of the later Lada Niva (VAZ-2121) off-roader, which as a result, retained key styling features of the Fiat 127 - most notably the distinctive forward-opening 'clamshell' hood; with the stepped beltline and glasshouse also bearing a strong resemblance to the 127.

Specials

Italian coachbuilder Moretti made a canvas-topped version in the style of the Renault Rodeo and Citroën Méhari called the "Midimaxi" (to set it apart from the smaller, 126-based Minimaxi). In spite of its rugged appearance, the front-wheel drive underpinnings remained the same. The Midimaxi was first shown at the 1971 Turin Motor Show, which was also when the very similar Fissore 127 Scout first appeared.

References

External links

 Fiat 127 forum
 Fiat 147 history in Portuguese
 Fiat 127 Club Italy
 fiat-racing.dk - A Fiat 127 racing team
 Two restored Fiat 127 in a Fiat Club Israel meeting
  Fiat 127 versions & types

127
Subcompact cars
Hatchbacks
Front-wheel-drive vehicles
1970s cars
1980s cars
Cars introduced in 1971